The 22nd Academy Awards were held on March 23, 1950, at the  RKO Pantages Theatre, honoring the films in 1949. 

This was the final year in which all five Best Picture nominees were in Black & White, and the first year in which every film nominated for Best Picture won multiple Oscars.

Awards

Nominees were announced on February 12, 1950. Winners are listed first and highlighted in boldface.

Academy Honorary Awards
Fred Astaire "for his unique artistry and his contributions to the technique of musical pictures".
Cecil B. DeMille "distinguished motion picture pioneer for 37 years of brilliant showmanship".
Jean Hersholt "in recognition of his service to the Academy during four terms as president".

Best Foreign Language Film
The Bicycle Thief (Italy)

Academy Juvenile Award
Bobby Driscoll

Presenters
 June Allyson and Dick Powell (Best Cinematography)
 Anne Baxter and John Hodiak (Short Subject Awards)
 Charles Brackett (Honorary Award to Cecil B. DeMille)
 James Cagney (Best Picture)
 Peggy Dow and Joanne Dru (Best Costume Design)
 José Ferrer (Scientific & Technical Awards)
 Barbara Hale and Ruth Roman (Best Art Direction)
 James Hilton (Writing Awards)
 John Lund (Best Sound Recording)
 Ida Lupino (Best Director)
 Ray Milland (Best Supporting Actress)
 George Murphy (Documentary Awards)
 Patricia Neal (Best Special Effects)
 Donald O'Connor (Juvenile Award to Bobby Driscoll)
 Cole Porter (Music Awards)
 Micheline Presle (Best Foreign Language Film)
 Ronald Reagan (Honorary Award to Jean Hersholt)
 Mark Robson (Best Film Editing)
 Ginger Rogers (Honorary Award to Fred Astaire)
 James Stewart (Best Actress)
 Claire Trevor (Best Supporting Actor)
 Jane Wyman (Best Actor)

Performers
Gene Autry
Ann Blyth
Arlene Dahl, Betty Garrett, Ricardo Montalbán, and Red Skelton ("Baby, It's Cold Outside" from Neptune's Daughter)
Dean Martin
Smilin' Jack Smith

Multiple nominations and awards

These films had multiple nominations:

 8 nominations: The Heiress
 7 nominations: All the King's Men and Come to the Stable
 6 nominations: Battleground and Champion
 4 nominations: Sands of Iwo Jima and Twelve O'Clock High
 3 nominations: Jolson Sings Again, A Letter to Three Wives, and Pinky
 2 nominations: Adventures of Don Juan, The Fallen Idol, Little Women, My Foolish Heart, and Prince of Foxes

The following films received multiple awards.

 4 wins: The Heiress
 3 wins: All the King's Men
 2 wins: Battleground, A Letter to Three Wives and Twelve O'Clock High

See also
7th Golden Globe Awards
1949 in film
 1st Primetime Emmy Awards
 2nd Primetime Emmy Awards
 3rd British Academy Film Awards
 4th Tony Awards

References

Academy Awards ceremonies
1949 film awards
1950 in Los Angeles
1950 in American cinema
March 1950 events in the United States